Moscow is the capital of Russia.

Moscow may also refer to:

Music
Moscow (Tchaikovsky), 1883 cantata by Tchaikovsky
Oh Moscow, an album by Lindsay Cooper
Moscow (Giardini), a hymn tune by Felice Giardini, also called Italian Hymn
Moscow, English version of the song Moskau by German band Dschinghis Khan
Moscow, Idaho, an EP by The Cassandra Complex

Places

United States
Moscow, Lamar County, Alabama, unincorporated
Moscow, Marengo County, Alabama, unincorporated
Moscow, Arkansas, unincorporated
Moscow, Idaho, a city
Moscow, Indiana, unincorporated
Moscow, Iowa, unincorporated
Moscow, Kansas, a city
Moscow, Kentucky, unincorporated
Moscow, Maine, a town
Moscow, Maryland, unincorporated and census-designated place
Moscow, Michigan, an unincorporated community
Moscow, Minnesota, unincorporated
Moscow, Mississippi, unincorporated
Moscow, Ohio, a village
Moscow, Licking County, Ohio, a ghost town
Moscow, Pennsylvania, a borough
Moscow, Tennessee, a city
Moscow, Texas, unincorporated
Moscow, Vermont, unincorporated
Moscow, West Virginia, unincorporated
Moscow, Wisconsin, a town
Moscow (community), Wisconsin, unincorporated
Moscow Township (disambiguation) Michigan

Elsewhere
Moscow, a hamlet within the township of Stone Mills, Ontario, Canada
Moscow, India, a village in the Kottayam district of Kerala, India
Moscow Oblast, the federal subject that surrounds the Russian capital
Moscow, East Ayrshire, a hamlet in East Ayrshire, Scotland

Other uses
David Moscow (born 1974), American actor
FC Moscow, a Russian football club
Moscow (cycling team), a Russian road-racing team 2009–2010
MoSCoW method, a prioritisation technique used in business analysis and software development
Moscow Patriarchate
Moscow-850, a giant Ferris wheel located at the All-Russia Exhibition Centre, Moscow
 Moscows, enemies in the platform video game The Kore Gang

See also
 
Mosco (disambiguation)
Moscou, Ghent, Belgium
Moskau (disambiguation)
Moskovsky (disambiguation)
Moskva (disambiguation)
New Moscow (disambiguation)